The tradable sector of a country's economy is made up of the industry sectors whose output in terms of goods and services are traded internationally, or could be traded internationally given a plausible variation in relative prices. Most commonly, the tradable sector consists largely of sectors of the manufacturing industry, while the non-tradable sector consists of locally-rendered services, including health, education, retail and construction.

Tradable jobs can be performed by individuals outside a country: manufacturing, consulting, engineering, finance. Non-tradable jobs can realistically only be performed by domestic workforce: government, health care, hospitality, food service, education, retail, and construction.

Australia
In 1990, Australia's sectoral outputs were 25.8% tradable and 74.2% non-tradable. Mining and manufacturing accounted for 18.3% and 61.4%, respectively, of the tradable sector.

References 

International trade